Craig Robert Watson (born 1966) is Scottish amateur golfer. He won the 1997 Amateur Championship and was in the British Walker Cup team that year. He was the original captain of the 2017 Walker Cup Great Britain and Ireland team but withdrew just before the event because of a family illness. He was the captain of the 2019 Walker Cup team.

Amateur wins
1992 St Andrews Links Trophy
1997 Amateur Championship
1998 St Andrews Links Trophy

Major championships

Wins (1)

Team appearances

Amateur
European Amateur Team Championship (representing Scotland): 1997, 1999, 2001 (winners), 2003
Walker Cup (representing Great Britain and Ireland): 1997, 2017 (non-playing captain, withdrew), 2019 (non-playing captain)
St Andrews Trophy (representing Great Britain and Ireland): 1998, 2016 (non-playing captain, tie), 2018 (non-playing captain)

References

Scottish male golfers
Amateur golfers
Golfers from Glasgow
1966 births
Living people